On-set virtual production (OSVP), also known as virtual production (VP), or In-Camera Visual Effects (ICVFX), often called The Volume is an entertainment technology for television and film production in which LED panels are used as a backdrop for a set, on which video or computer-generated imagery can be displayed in real-time. The technology has become famous with the development of ILM's StageCraft and its use in The Mandalorian.

Technology 
With careful adjustment and calibration, an OSVP set can be made to closely approximate the appearance of a real set or outdoor location. OSVP can be viewed as an application of extended reality. OSVP contrasts with virtual studio technology, in which a green screen backdrop surrounds the set, and the virtual surroundings are composited into the green screen plate downstream from the camera, in that in OSVP the virtual world surrounding the set is visible to the camera, actors, and crew, and objects on set are illuminated by light from the LED screen, creating realistic interactive lighting effects, and that the virtual background and foreground are captured directly in camera, complete with natural subtle cues like lens distortion, depth of field effects, bokeh and lens flare. This makes it a far more natural experience that more closely approximates location shooting, making the film-making process faster and more intuitive than can be achieved on a virtual set.

To render parallax depth cues correctly from the viewpoint of a moving camera, the system requires the use of match moving of the background imagery based on data from low-latency real-time motion capture technology to track the camera.

Industry organizations including SMPTE, the Academy of Motion Picture Arts and Sciences and the American Society of Cinematographers have started initiatives to support the development of OSVP.

History 

Since its inventive use in The Mandalorian, the technology has become increasingly popular. Miles Perkins, industry manager of film and TV for Epic Games and maker of the Unreal Engine, states: "We are tracking roughly 300 stages, up from only three in 2019”. 

Stages that use OSVP include the various StageCraft stages, Pixomondo’s Toronto-based LED stage, which has a longterm lease from CBS or Lux Machina various stages. In Japan, the LED wall and virtual production were used by Toei Company for its Super Sentai shows Avataro Sentai Donbrothers and Ohsama Sentai King-Ohger, with the latter also being produced in collaboration with Sony PCL Inc.

Productions using the technologies

Television series 

 The Mandalorian (2019–present)
 The Book of Boba Fett (2021)
 Star Trek: Discovery (2021-2023)
 How I Met Your Father (2022–present)
 Our Flag Means Death (2022–present)
 Obi-Wan Kenobi (2022)
 The Old Man (2022)
 Andor (2022)
 House of the Dragon (2022)
 1899 (2022)
 Avataro Sentai Donbrothers (2022)
 Ohsama Sentai King-Ohger (2023)
 Ahsoka (2023)
 The Acolyte (TBA)
 Masters of the Air (TBA)
 Percy Jackson and the Olympians (2024)

Feature films 
 Oblivion (2013)
 Rogue One: A Star Wars Story (2016)
 The Jungle Book (2016)
 Ghost in the Shell (2017)
 Solo: A Star Wars Story (2018)
 The Lion King (2019)
 The Irishman (2019)
 Star Wars: The Rise of Skywalker (2019)
 The Midnight Sky (2020)
 In vacanza su Marte (2020)
 Red Notice (2021)
 The Batman (2022)
 Thor: Love and Thunder (2022)
 Top Gun: Maverick (2022)
 Bullet Train (2022)
 Black Adam (2022)
 Divinity (2023)
 Ant-Man and the Wasp: Quantumania (2023)
 Shazam! Fury of the Gods (2023)
 Megalopolis (TBA)

Short films 
 The Vandal (2021)

References 

Cinematic techniques
Visual effects
Mixed reality